In mathematics, more specifically in the representation theory of reductive Lie groups, a -module is an algebraic object, first introduced by Harish-Chandra, used to deal with continuous infinite-dimensional representations using algebraic techniques. Harish-Chandra showed that the study of irreducible unitary representations of a real reductive Lie group, G, could be reduced to the study of irreducible -modules, where  is the Lie algebra of G and K is a maximal compact subgroup of G.

Definition
Let G be a real Lie group. Let  be its Lie algebra, and K a maximal compact subgroup with Lie algebra .
1. for any v ∈ V, k ∈ K, and X ∈ 

2. for any v ∈ V, Kv spans a finite-dimensional subspace of V on which the action of K is continuous
3. for any v ∈ V and Y ∈ 

The first condition can be understood as follows: if G is the general linear group GL(n, R), then  is the algebra of all n by n matrices, and the adjoint action of k on X is kXk−1; condition 1 can then be read as

Notes

References

Representation theory of Lie groups